Warme Steinach is a river of Bavaria, Germany. It flows into the Red Main east of Bayreuth.

See also
List of rivers of Bavaria

References

Rivers of Bavaria
Bayreuth (district)
Rivers of Germany